Eric Stevenson may refer to:

 Eric Stevenson (politician) (born 1956), former member of the New York State Assembly
 Eric Stevenson (footballer) (1942–2017), Scottish former footballer
 Eric Stevenson (soccer) (born 1990), American soccer player